Mandrake Project was a band based in Pittsburgh, Pennsylvania.

History
Their track "An Ode to the Spaceman" was included on the soundtrack to the independent film, Cure for the Crash, by Brian Paul Higgins. The movie, a docu-drama of sorts, explores the hobo/train-hopping culture in America during the Hurricane Katrina disaster. It has appeared at various major film festivals and won Best Feature Film at the Seattle Truly Indie Film Fest in 2010.

Through a bizarre turn of events, the band ended up signing a contract with Swedish label Blistering Records, who deal primarily with hard rock and metal acts.

Despite the often confusing representation between the band and label, the album garnered critical praise in the months after its release in both press and AAA radio. In February 2009, a pre-release copy of "A Miraculous Container" caught the ear of John Diliberto, host of the nationally syndicated radio program Echoes. The album appeared on the show's Top 25 in June 2009 with artists such as Moby, Bill Frisell, Robin Guthrie and Leo Abrahams, peaking at #2 in August and earning a spot on the overall Top 25 for 2009.

This eventually led to an invitation to perform live for an installment of the show's acclaimed Livingroom Concert Series. One of the live tracks recorded during the concert, "Beauxsong" was included on the 15th Anniversary Echoes Livingroom Concert Series CD, Still Echoes, alongside artists as diverse as Yo-Yo Ma, Pat Metheny, Air, Al Di Meola and Brian Eno.  In addition, Mandrake Project was added to both John Diliberto's Top 10 CD's and Songs lists for 2009, ranking #9 for Best Album with A Miraculous Container and #7 for Best Song with "And Five Makes Twenty."

Jean-Phillipe Haas, French webzine critic at Chromatique.net listed A Miraculous Container as his pick for the #1 album in 2009. Several other US & European music webzines and press offered positive reviews of the record as well in the months after its release.

References

Musical groups from Pittsburgh